Anatoliy Piskulin (born 1 December 1952) is a retired triple jumper who represented the Soviet Union. He won two medals at the European Indoor Championships as well as a bronze medal at the 1978 European Championships in Athletics.

Achievements

Notes 

1952 births
Living people
Soviet male triple jumpers
European Athletics Championships medalists
Universiade medalists in athletics (track and field)
Universiade gold medalists for the Soviet Union
Universiade silver medalists for the Soviet Union
Medalists at the 1975 Summer Universiade
Medalists at the 1977 Summer Universiade